Bernard Leadon (pronounced led-un; born July 19, 1947) is an American singer, musician, songwriter and founding member of the Eagles, for which he was inducted into the Rock and Roll Hall of Fame in 1998. Prior to the Eagles, he was a member of three country rock bands: Hearts & Flowers, Dillard & Clark, and the Flying Burrito Brothers. He is a multi-instrumentalist (guitar, banjo, mandolin, steel guitar, dobro) coming from a bluegrass background. He introduced elements of this music to a mainstream audience during his tenure with the Eagles.

Leadon's music career since leaving the Eagles has been low-key, resulting in two solo albums (the first actually being a collaborative project with Michael Georgiades) with a gap of 27 years in between. Leadon has also appeared on many other artists' records as a session musician.

Early life and musical beginnings

In San Diego, California, Leadon met fellow musicians Ed Douglas and Larry Murray of the local bluegrass outfit the Scottsville Squirrel Barkers. The Barkers proved a breeding ground for future California country rock talent, including shy, 18-year-old mandolin player Chris Hillman, with whom Leadon maintained a lifelong friendship. Augmented by banjo player (and future Flying Burrito Brother) Kenny Wertz, the Squirrel Barkers eventually asked Leadon to join the group, upon Wertz's joining the Air Force in 1963.

He later met  future Eagles lead guitarist Don Felder, whose band, the Continentals, had just lost guitarist Stephen Stills. 

A call from ex-Squirrel Barker Larry Murray in 1967 to join his fledgling psychedelic country-folk group Hearts & Flowers brought Leadon to California, where he became involved with the burgeoning L.A. folk/country rock scene. Leadon recorded one album with the band, its second release, Of Horses, Kids, and Forgotten Women, for Capitol Records. The record was a local hit but failed to make much of a dent on the national album charts. Discouraged, the group disbanded the following year.

Dillard & Clark
By late 1968, Leadon had befriended bluegrass/banjo legend Doug Dillard, late of the Dillards. While staying with Dillard, informal jam sessions with songwriter and ex-Byrds member Gene Clark began to take shape, and morphed into what eventually became the country-rock band Dillard & Clark. In 1968, the group recorded The Fantastic Expedition of Dillard & Clark, featuring Leadon's backing vocals and multi-instrumental work. The album included several compositions co-written with Clark, most notably the future Eagles staple (and somewhat of a signature song for Leadon) from their debut album, "Train Leaves Here This Morning".

The Flying Burrito Brothers

Leadon left Dillard & Clark in 1969, eventually reconnecting with ex-Squirrel Barker (and ex-Byrd) Chris Hillman, who asked him to join the Flying Burrito Brothers, a fledgling country-rock band that Hillman had formed a year earlier with fellow ex-Byrd Gram Parsons. Leadon recorded two albums with the group: Burrito Deluxe and the post-Parsons LP The Flying Burrito Bros. After the latter album's release in 1971, Leadon had tired of the band's lack of commercial success and decided to leave the band to pursue an opportunity to play with three musicians he had worked with while moonlighting in Linda Ronstadt's backing band that summer. The resultant project, the Eagles, found the success he had craved.

Eagles

Leadon was the last original member to join the Eagles, a band initially formed by guitarist/singer Glenn Frey, drummer/singer Don Henley, and former Poco bassist/singer Randy Meisner. Leadon is often credited with helping shape the band's early country-rock sound, bringing his strong sense of harmony as well as his country, bluegrass and acoustic sensibilities to the group. Instruments he played during his tenure in the band were electric guitar, B-Bender, acoustic guitar, banjo, mandolin, dobro, and pedal steel guitar.

Upon the release of their debut album, Eagles, the group met with near instantaneous success, due largely to the strength of their hit singles "Take It Easy", "Peaceful Easy Feeling", and "Witchy Woman" (co-written by Leadon and Henley), all of which highlighted Leadon's multi-instrumental talent on electric guitar, B-Bender, banjo, and harmony vocals. Their follow-up, Desperado, was another strong country-rock venture highlighted by the classics "Tequila Sunrise" and the title track. Leadon had a prominent role on the album, but it was met by surprisingly lukewarm reviews and lackluster sales. As a result, the band attempted to distance itself from the "country rock" label for their third album On the Border. In doing so, Leadon encouraged the group to recruit his old friend, guitarist Don Felder, to the band. The result was the guitar-heavy top 40 hit "Already Gone". The album also included "My Man", Leadon's touching tribute to his old bandmate and friend Gram Parsons, who had died of a drug overdose the year prior at Joshua Tree National Monument in southeastern California.

With the wild success of On the Border and its follow-up smash, One of These Nights, tension within the band grew, with some sources saying Leadon grew increasingly frustrated by the band's direction away from his beloved country and bluegrass and toward album-oriented stadium rock. He famously quit the band in 1975 by pouring a beer over Glenn Frey's head. He later cited a need to get healthy and break the vicious cycle of touring, recording, and heavy drug use that was rampant within the band.

Upon Leadon's departure, Asylum Records released Their Greatest Hits (1971–1975), which highlighted the band's Leadon years and went on to become the best-selling album in United States history, with sales in excess of 38 million units. He was replaced by former James Gang guitarist and singer Joe Walsh.

Although it has long been believed that he left because he was dissatisfied with the band moving into rock and roll, Leadon denies it and said in 2013, "That's an oversimplification; it implies that I had no interest in rock or blues or anything but country rock. That's just not the case. I didn't just play Fender Telecaster. I played a Gibson Les Paul and I enjoyed rock & roll. That's evident from the early albums."

Later career

Upon leaving the Eagles, Leadon retreated from the limelight, only to resurface in 1977 with musician friend Michael Georgiades for the album, Natural Progressions (credited to The Bernie Leadon-Michael Georgiades Band), featuring Leadon and Georgiades on guitars and alternating lead vocals, along with Bryan Garofalo on bass, Dave Kemper on drums, and Steve Goldstein on keyboard.

In 1985, he recorded an album of bluegrass and gospel favorites under the name Ever Call Ready, featuring Chris Hillman and Al Perkins. He also had a short stint with the Nitty Gritty Dirt Band in the late 1980s.

In 1993, he became a member of Run C&W, a novelty group singing Motown hits "bluegrass style", recording two albums for MCA Records.

In 1998, Leadon reunited with the Eagles in New York City for the band's induction into the Rock and Roll Hall of Fame. All seven current and former Eagles members performed together on "Take It Easy" and "Hotel California".

In 2004, he released his second solo effort in 27 years (and his first under solely his name), Mirror.

Leadon toured with The Eagles from 2013 through 2015 during their History of the Eagles Tour In 2015, Leadon appeared on producer Ethan Johns' third solo album, Silver Liner.

In February 2016, Leadon appeared at the Grammy Awards ceremony with Jackson Browne and the current surviving Eagles members - Don Henley, Joe Walsh, and Timothy B. Schmit - performing "Take it Easy", in tribute to Glenn Frey who had died a month earlier.

Personal life 
His brother is musician Tom Leadon, who played in the band Mudcrutch, which began the career of Tom Petty.

For a few years in the mid-1970s, Leadon lived in Topanga Canyon, a bohemian enclave known for its musician residents. Leadon's house-plus-recording-studio had previously been owned by singer-songwriter Neil Young, and was the site of frequent parties. Leadon lived with Patti Davis, the free-spirited daughter of conservative California Governor Ronald Reagan, who was at that time campaigning for president, and distancing himself from his daughter because Leadon and she were unmarried but living together. Leadon and Davis co-wrote the song "I Wish You Peace", which Leadon insisted the Eagles include on the album One of These Nights, against the wishes of his bandmates.

He currently resides in Nashville, Tennessee, where he is a session musician and producer.

Discography

References

Sources

External links

Bernie Leadon Online

The Complete Hearts and Flowers Liner Notes
The Scottsville Squirrel Barkers
Rock of Ages' Bernie Leadon Interview 
Bernie Leadon's Official Website-Archived

American male singer-songwriters
American multi-instrumentalists
American bluegrass musicians
American country rock musicians
American banjoists
American bluegrass guitarists
American male guitarists
American bluegrass mandolinists
American country banjoists
American country guitarists
American country mandolinists
American country singer-songwriters
American country rock singers
American rock guitarists
American session musicians
1947 births
Living people
Grammy Award winners
Singer-songwriters from California
American mandolinists
American surfers
Lead guitarists
Pedal steel guitarists
Resonator guitarists
Eagles (band) members
The Flying Burrito Brothers members
Nitty Gritty Dirt Band members
Asylum Records artists
Musicians from Minneapolis
Gainesville High School (Florida) alumni
People from Topanga, California
20th-century American musicians
21st-century American composers
Singer-songwriters from Minnesota
Guitarists from Minnesota
20th-century American guitarists
Catholics from California
Run C&W members
Country musicians from California
Country musicians from Minnesota